Rebecca Patek is an American choreographer and performance artist.

References

External links
 Website for Rebecca Patek
 2ge(a)ther we are w/hole, TimeOut New York

American choreographers
American performance artists
Living people
Year of birth missing (living people)